Ahmed Mohamed Abdel Kader Radwan (born 23 May 1999), commonly known as Ahmed Abdel Kader, is an Egyptian footballer who plays for Egyptian Premier League side Al Ahly as an attacking midfielder.

Honours
Al Ahly
 CAF Super Cup: 2021 (December)
 FIFA Club World Cup:Third-Place 2021
 Egyptian Super Cup: 2021–22

References

1993 births
Living people
Footballers from Cairo
Association football midfielders
Egyptian footballers
Egyptian expatriate footballers
Expatriate footballers in the Czech Republic
Egyptian expatriate sportspeople in the Czech Republic
Czech National Football League players
Egyptian Premier League players
AC Sparta Prague players
Al Ahly SC players
Smouha SC players